Stephen Christopher Sanchez is an American singer-songwriter. Based in Nashville Sanchez released his debut extended play, What Was, Not Now, in October 2021. On September 1, 2021, Sanchez released the single "Until I Found You", which peaked at number 23 on the Billboard Hot 100 and number 16 on the UK Singles Chart.

Career 
In June 2020, Sanchez posted a cover of Cage the Elephant's "Cigarette Daydreams" on TikTok and he built an audience through a steady stream of content, attracting over 122.1K followers on TikTok.

After sharing a snippet of "Lady by the Sea", singer-songwriter Jeremy Zucker reached out offering to produce the official version, which was released in July 2020; as a result Sanchez signed a deal with Republic Records. Sanchez worked with producer Ian Fitchuk on his debut EP What Was, Not Now which was released in October 2021.

On November 4, 2022, he released a single with Ashe, titled "Missing You".

January 25, 2023, he then released a single titled "Evangeline" which kicked off his upcoming headline tour. 

Sanchez appeared on The Tonight Show Starring Jimmy Fallon to help promote the new song and his headline tour. Sanchez performed his song "Evangeline"  on the show.

As of February 7th, the tour was considered to be sold out making a booming start for Sanchez's career.

Discography

Extended plays

Singles

References

External links
 

2002 births
American TikTokers 
Hispanic and Latino American people
Living people
Republic Records artists
Mercury Records artists